Zvërnec is a community in Vlorë County, Albania. At the 2015 local government reform it became part of the municipality Vlorë. It is situated northwest of the city of Vlorë. It is inhabited by ethnic Greeks who speak a unique northern Greek dialect, as well as Aromanians.

History
During classical antiquity the coastal area of the Bay of Vlorë, where the present-day villages of Zvërnec and Nartë are located, was settled by Ancient Greeks. Since at present those two villages constitute the northernmost pockets of Modern Greek speech, scholar Hatzopoulos (1997) wonders if it is a coincidence or they are isolated relics of the ancient Balaiitai and Horikioi. The view of an uninterrupted Greek presence from antiquity is rejected by Sh. Demiraj (2010), on the grounds that it is not backed up by linguistic evidence or historic documentation, instead arguing that their ancestors consist of relatively late incoming emigrants from the Greek speaking areas of Arta. Demiraj points to anthroponymic data gathered from 16th century Ottoman tax registers, specifically those of the years 1520 and 1583, in which the defters of the village of Narta display south Albanian Orthodox anthroponomy. Moreover, the names attested lack the Greek suffix "s", and contain consonants unusual to modern Greek, such as /b (Bogdan, Tërbari). Also the population of the village partly consists of immigrants from neighboring Albanian villages, indicated by surnames like Bulku or Palasa, the issue regarding the use of the Greek language remains open. Kyriazis (2012) argued that those 16th century Ottoman registers provide proofs of the continuity and the differentiation of the synthesis of the population. Also, the absence of the suffix -s does not show a lack of the Greek element, as this was quite typical in Ottoman records on areas that were undoubtedly Greek-speaking. If we consider that the local Greek speech has a depth of time that reaches antiquity, then we should investigate and interpret how and when it acquired characteristics of northern vocalism.

Historian Alain Ducellier identifies the Byzantine outpost of Spinaritsa with Zvernec. At 1297 Spinaritza was governed by dux Kalamanos, member of the noble Greek Strategopoulos family. Later at 1301 governor of the Spinaritza district became Andronikos Palaiologos.

Demographics
Zvërnec, together with nearby Nartë, is a Greek-speaking pocket in the area north of Vlorë. There are speakers of Aromanian also present in Zvërnec.

According to a 2014 state report, the total number of registered citizens that belong to the Greek minority is 900.

Location
The surrounding region is full of salt marshes. Narta Lagoon, which hosts a unique ecosystem, lies north of the village. Near the village lies the island that bears the same name, and the Byzantine monastery dedicated to the Dormition of the Mother of God. To the east of the settlement there is a lighthouse.

Notable people
 Fatos Arapi, Albanian writer and translator

Citations

Bibliography

External links
 Picture of the lighthouse

Aromanian settlements in Albania
Greek communities in Albania
Populated places in Vlorë
Villages in Vlorë County